Flora Mary McDonnell, as the daughter of an Earl also known as Lady Flora McDonnell (born 7 November 1963) is an artist, illustrator, and prize-winning author of children's books.

Early life
McDonnell is the eldest daughter of Alexander McDonnell, 9th Earl of Antrim, the sister of the 10th Earl, and a niece of the artist Hector McDonnell. 

McDonnell was educated at St Mary's Shaftesbury, an independent Roman Catholic girls’ school Gresham's School, a mixed independent school in Norfolk, and Exeter College, Oxford, from 1982 to 1984, then at the City and Guilds of London Art School from 1984 to 1989.

McDonnell began her children's book career in 1994 with publishing I Love Animals (1994). Since then, she has published many children's books and collaborated with authors and poets.

She married Dr Thomas Pennybacker in 2003, and they have one son, born in 2004. She is currently based in London.

Awards
The Mother Goose Award for first time published children's book illustrator (1995)

Publications

Children's books
I Love Animals (Walker Books, 1994) 
I Love Boats (Walker Books, 1996) 
Flora McDonnell's ABC (Walker Books, 1998) 
Splash! (Candlewick Books, 1999) 
The Mermaid's Purse [poems by Ted Hughes, illustrated by Flora McDonnell] (Knopf Books, 2000) 
The Cat and the Cuckoo [by Ted Hughes, illustrated by Flora McDonnell] (Roaring Brook Press, 2003) 
Sparky (Candlewick Books, 2004) 
Giddy up! Let's Ride! (New Line Books, 2006) 
Out of a Dark Winter's Night (Thames and Hudson, 2020)

Other
Threads of Hope [ed. Flora McDonnell] (Short Books, 2003)

References

Burke's Peerage and Baronetage, 106th edition, (1999), volume 1, page 90.
Flora McDonnell at walkerbooks.co.uk
Lady Flora McDonnell at ThePeerage.com
List of notable Old Greshamians
Descendants of William the Conqueror

Flora McDonnell - About at FloraMcDonnell.com
Flora McDonnell - Books at FloraMcDonnell.com

1963 births
Alumni of Exeter College, Oxford
Daughters of Irish earls
English children's writers
Living people
People educated at Gresham's School
People educated at St Mary's School, Shaftesbury